Suravaram Sudhakar Reddy is the former General Secretary of the Communist Party of India (CPI) from 2012 to 2019. He was a member of the 12th and 14th Lok Sabha of India. He represented the Nalgonda constituency of Telangana.

He was elected to serve as General Secretary of Communist Party of India (CPI), on 31 March 2012 in the 21st party Congress. He has previously served as the Chairman of Parliamentary Standing Committee on Labour, while being a member of the parliament.

Born on 25 March 1942 at Hyderabad, he was educated in the Municipal High School and Coles memorial High school in Kurnool.

He did his BA in History from Osmania College, Kurnool, in 1964 and LLB from Osmania University Law College in Hyderabad in the year 1967.

When he was 15, he became a crucial figure in an agitation seeking blackboards, chalk and books for his school in Kurnool, Andhra Pradesh. The movement spread and schools across Kurnool started raising similar demands. Reddy was later elected twice from the Nalgonda parliamentary constituency. Leader of several mass struggles, and widely admired within the party and outside.

External links

 Home Page on the Parliament of India's Website
 CPI Khammam
 http://www.hardnewsmedia.com/2012/09/5636#sthash.twBTT5gv.dpuf

References

1942 births
Living people
Communist Party of India politicians from Telangana
People from Mahbubnagar district
India MPs 1998–1999
India MPs 2004–2009
Lok Sabha members from Telangana
People from Nalgonda district